Corat (Ҹорат, جورات; also Jorat and Dzhorat) is a village and municipality in Sumqayit, Azerbaijan.  It has a population of 9,028.

References 

Populated places in Sumgait